Lebanon High School can refer to more than one educational institution in the United States:

Lebanon High School (Illinois) — Lebanon, Illinois
Lebanon High School (Missouri) — Lebanon, Missouri
Lebanon High School (New Hampshire) — Lebanon, New Hampshire
Lebanon High School (Ohio) — Lebanon, Ohio
Lebanon High School (Oregon) — Lebanon, Oregon
Lebanon High School (Pennsylvania) — Lebanon, Pennsylvania
Lebanon High School (Tennessee) — Lebanon, Tennessee
Lebanon High School (Virginia) — Lebanon, Virginia
Lebanon Senior High School — Lebanon, Indiana
Mt. Lebanon High School — Pittsburgh, Pennsylvania
Northern Lebanon High School — Fredericksburg, Pennsylvania
Eastern Lebanon County High School — Myerstown, Pennsylvania